Formodexia is a genus of bristle flies in the family Tachinidae.

Species 
Formodexia volucelloides Malloch, 1936

References 

Diptera of Australasia
Tachinidae genera
Dexiinae
Monotypic Brachycera genera
Taxa named by Roger Ward Crosskey